Marlon Sündermann (born 16 May 1998) is a German footballer who plays as a goalkeeper for Hessen Kassel.

Career
Sündermann began his youth career at RSV Göttingen 05 and JFV Göttingen, before joining the academy of Hannover 96 in 2017. He made his professional debut for Hannover's first team in the 2. Bundesliga on 23 May 2021, coming on as a half-time substitute for Michael Ratajczak against 1. FC Nürnberg.

Personal life
Sündermann was born in Kassel, and grew up in Göttingen.

References

External links
 
 
 
 

1998 births
Living people
Sportspeople from Kassel
Footballers from Hesse
German footballers
Association football goalkeepers
Hannover 96 II players
Hannover 96 players
KSV Hessen Kassel players
2. Bundesliga players
Regionalliga players